The F.E. Company Dredge No. 4, also known as the Pedro Dredge and the Chicken Dredge, was originally owned by the Fairbanks Exploration Company (F.E. Co.), a subsidiary of the United States Smelting Refining & Mining Co. (USSR&M). It was built by the Yuba Manufacturing Company in California, and was shipped to Pedro Creek north of Fairbanks, Alaska in 1938. It was assembled there, and operated until 1958.

The following year it was disassembled, trucked to Chicken, Alaska and reassembled. The dredge commenced operations on lower Chicken Creek in September and worked for approximately five months every year thereafter until October 1967, when it produced its final cleanup.

In 1998, the 500 ton dredge was moved overland to its current location at the Chicken Gold Camp.

In 2006, the dredge was added to the National Register of Historic Places and was opened to the public.

See also
 Chatanika gold dredge (Fairbanks)
 Coal Creek Historic Mining District
 Goldstream Dredge No. 8
 National Register of Historic Places listings in Southeast Fairbanks Census Area, Alaska

References

External links
 Pedro Dredge
 Pedro Gold Dredge Chicken, Alaska

Buildings and structures in Southeast Fairbanks Census Area, Alaska
Industrial buildings and structures on the National Register of Historic Places in Alaska
Industrial equipment on the National Register of Historic Places
Gold dredges
Mining museums in Alaska
Museums in Unorganized Borough, Alaska
Pre-statehood history of Alaska
Tourist attractions in Southeast Fairbanks Census Area, Alaska
Gold mining in the United States
Buildings and structures on the National Register of Historic Places in Southeast Fairbanks Census Area, Alaska